The Colby Trojans are the sports teams of Colby Community College located in Colby, Kansas, United States. They participate in the National Junior College Athletic Association (NJCAA) and in the Kansas Jayhawk Community College Conference.

Sports

Men's Sports
Baseball
Basketball
Cross country
Track & field
Wrestling

Women's Sports
Basketball
Cross country
Softball
Track & field
Volleyball

Additional teams
Equestrian
Livestock judging
Rodeo
Cheer and Dance Team

References

External links
 

Sports teams in Kansas